The 1982 Dutch Grand Prix was a Formula One motor race held at Zandvoort on 3 July 1982. The race, contested over 72 laps, was the ninth race of the 1982 Formula One season and was won by Didier Pironi, driving a Ferrari, with Nelson Piquet second in a Brabham-BMW and Keke Rosberg third in a Williams-Ford.

René Arnoux started from pole position, but he crashed out at the notorious Tarzan Corner when his Renault's throttle stuck open and he hit the tyre barriers. Arnoux walked away from the crash unharmed.

This was the first Grand Prix after the death of Riccardo Paletti three weeks earlier in Montreal. This was also the final win of Didier Pironi's Formula One career.

Ferrari entered Patrick Tambay to replace Gilles Villeneuve, who had been killed during qualifying a few race weekends prior, at the Belgian Grand Prix.

Classification

Pre-qualifying

Qualifying

Race

Championship standings after the race

Drivers' Championship standings

Constructors' Championship standings

Note: Only the top five positions are included for both sets of standings.

References

Dutch Grand Prix
Grand Prix
Dutch Grand Prix
Dutch Grand Prix